Aubry is a French surname and given name. Notable people with the name include
 Aubry or Alberic of Trois-Fontaines (died c. 1252), medieval Cistercian chronicler who wrote in Latin
 Alan Aubry (born 1974), French photographer
 Augusto Aubry (1849–1912), Italian vice-admiral
 Cécile Aubry (1928–2010), French film actress and television screenwriter and director
 Charles Aubry (1803–1883), French jurist
 Charles Philippe Aubry (died 1770), governor of French Louisiana
 Emilie Aubry (born 1989), Swiss professional racing cyclist
 Etienne Aubry (1746–1781), French painter
 Gabriel Aubry (born 1975), French-Canadian fashion model
 Gilbert Aubry (born 1942), Roman Catholic bishop
 Gwenaëlle Aubry (born 1971), French novelist and philosopher
 Francois Xavier Aubry (1824–1854), French Canadian merchant and explorer of the American Southwest.
 Jean-Frédéric-Emile Aubry (1882–1950), French music critic, translator and poet
 Jeffrion Aubry (born 1948), member of the New York State Assembly
 Louis-François Aubry (1770 – c. 1850), French portrait painter
 Marie Aubry (1656–1704), French operatic soprano
 Martine Aubry (born Martine Delors in 1950), French politician 
 Nicolas Aubry, French priest who traveled to Acadia (present day Canada) in 1604 
 Octave Aubry (1881–1946), French novelist and historian
 Pascale Claude Aubry, the plaintiff in Aubry v Éditions Vice-Versa Inc, a leading Canadian Supreme Court case on privacy rights in Quebec
 Pierre Aubry (born 1960), Canadian former National Hockey League player
 René Aubry (born 1956), French composer
 Roger-Émile Aubry (1923–2010), Roman Catholic bishop
 Serge Aubry (1942–2011), World Hockey Association player and National Hockey League coach
 Yves Aubry, Canadian ornithologist

See also
 Aubrey